Tore Bjørnsen (born 12 December 1943) is a Norwegian weightlifter. He competed in the men's middleweight event at the 1972 Summer Olympics.

References

1943 births
Living people
Norwegian male weightlifters
Olympic weightlifters of Norway
Weightlifters at the 1972 Summer Olympics
Sportspeople from Stavanger
20th-century Norwegian people